Psacothea nigrostigma is a species of beetle in the family Cerambycidae. It was described by Wang, Chiang and Zheng in 2002.

References

Lamiini
Beetles described in 2002